The U.S. Environmental Protection Agency's National Exposure Research Laboratory (NERL) is a national laboratory that conducts research and development to find improved methods, measurements, and models to assess and predict exposures of humans and ecosystems to pollutants and other conditions in air, water, soil, and food. It is one of three national laboratories that conduct research for EPA's Office of Research and Development. NERL is also responsible for testing and establishing new Federal Reference Methods (FRM) and Federal Equivalent Methods (FEM). NERL is headquartered in Research Triangle Park, NC, and has locations in North Carolina, Ohio, Georgia and Nevada.

NERL's Niches

The NERL focuses its efforts on the following areas:

 Analytical/Monitoring Methods Development
 Indicators/Indices of Exposure
 Exposure/Dose Process Characterization
 Decision Support Tools
 Predictive Modeling
 Source Apportionment/Environmental Forensics

Publication Topics

NERL published papers in the following areas

 Air
Exposure
Measurement and Emissions
Modeling
Multipollutant
Climate and Energy
Energy
Modeling
Ecosystems
Ecological Risk Assessment
Ecosystems and Climate Change 
Human Health Risk Assessment

External links
EPA's National Exposure Research Laboratory (NERL) at the U.S. Environmental Protection Agency website.

Notes

References

 National Exposure Research Laboratory; Federal Laboratory Consortium for Technology Transfer website [link accessed on August 31, 2007].
 National Exposure Research Laboratory; West Virginia High Technology Consortium Foundation [link accessed on August 31, 2007].

Laboratories in the United States
United States Environmental Protection Agency